= Georgian Mountain cattle =

Breed of cattle

The Georgian Mountain (Georgian: ქართული მთის საქონელი) is a local cattle breed from Georgia. They can be black, black and white or red and white in colour. It is a very small breed, adapted to the harsh mountain conditions of the Caucasus; average height at the withers is 100 cm for cows and 112 cm for bulls. The live weight of mature cows is 220–280 kg and that of bulls is 270–370 kg.
